In geometric data analysis and statistical shape analysis, principal geodesic analysis is a generalization of principal component analysis to a non-Euclidean, non-linear setting of manifolds suitable for use with shape descriptors such as medial representations.

References
 Principal Geodesic Analysis for the Study of Nonlinear Statistics of Shape
 Probabilistic Principal Geodesic Analysis
 Kernel Principal Geodesic Analysis
 Mixture Probabilistic Principal Geodesic Analysis
Image processing
Digital geometry
Differential geometry
Topology
Factor analysis